Ioana Plesu (born December 17, 1980) is a Canadian former professional tennis player.

Plesu, born to Romanian immigrant parents, grew up in Sainte-Foy, Quebec and was a Canadian junior champion. She played four years of collegiate tennis for Duke University, after which she competed professionally. Her only WTA Tour singles main draw appearance came as a wildcard at the 1997 Challenge Bell. She stopped touring in order to study medicine and now works as a family physician.

ITF finals

Doubles: 2 (0–2)

References

External links
 
 

1980 births
Living people
Canadian female tennis players
Duke Blue Devils women's tennis players
People from Sainte-Foy, Quebec City
Sportspeople from Quebec City
Canadian people of Romanian descent
Racket sportspeople from Quebec